Trạm Tấu is a township and capital of Trạm Tấu District, Yên Bái Province, Vietnam.

References

Populated places in Yên Bái province
District capitals in Vietnam
Townships in Vietnam